Welcome to the Family is an American sitcom television series that aired on NBC from October 3, to October 17, 2013 on Thursdays at 8:30 p.m. Eastern/7:30 p.m. Central, after Parks and Recreation. On May 10, 2013, the network placed a series order for the single camera comedy, which was canceled from NBC television schedule on October 18, 2013 after three episodes had aired.

Plot
The series follows a clash of cultures involving two American families brought together by the couple formed by Junior, the valedictorian son of a Latino family, and Molly, the less academic daughter of an Anglo family. The two are finishing high school and Junior is Stanford bound. On graduation day, they discover that Molly is pregnant. The pair decide to get married, forcing a bonding and blending of their two very different families.

Cast

Main cast
Mike O'Malley as Dr. Daniel Stacy "Dan" Yoder – Molly's father
Mary McCormack as Caroline Yoder – Molly's mother
Ella Rae Peck as Molly Yoder
Joey Haro as Junior Hernandez
Ricardo Antonio Chavira as Miguel Hernandez – Junior's father
Justina Machado as Lisette Hernandez – Junior's mother
Fabrizio Zacharee Guido as Demetrio Hernandez

Guest stars
Eva Longoria as Demetrio's teacher—and Miguel's ex-girlfriend.
Diedrich Bader as Rick, Mike's friend and business partner.
Josh Meyers as Rollins, Caroline's annoying coworker.
Joel Murray as Gabe, Caroline's recovering-alcoholic coworker. 
Bonita Friedericy as Sandra, Molly's spiritual adviser.
Craig Cackowski as Todd, Mike's basketball teammate.
Dorion Renaud as Friend, Molly and Juniors Classmate. 
Tisha Terrasini Banker as Woman.
Jamie McShane as Officer Simon.

Episodes

Release
The series was available on Hulu at the time of its premiere, and was also available on STAR World India.

Reception
Reviews were negative. In a review for Variety, Brian Lowry said Welcome to the Family was "a sitcom with all the depth of a knock-knock joke." The Washington Post's Hank Steuver anointed it as his "nominee for quickest and most punitive cancellation" and gave it an F. A writer for TV by the Numbers described the viewership as "dismal", falling to "anemic" by the second week.

References

External links

 
 

2010s American single-camera sitcoms
2013 American television series debuts
2013 American television series endings
English-language television shows
NBC original programming
Television series by Sony Pictures Television
Television shows set in Los Angeles